Georgetown Lighthouse may refer to:

Georgetown Light
Georgetown Lighthouse, Guyana